Ficus polita, the heart-leaved fig, is a species of fig that is native to forests of tropical Africa,

Distribution
The tree is found in Lowland rainforest and gallery forest (west and central Africa), coastal & dry forest (east and southern African coast), and on Madagascar.

Description
Ficus polita is similar to the Pondoland fig, (Ficus bizanae), an endemic tropical forest species in South Africa. The leaves have entire margins and are often heart-shaped, with the tip acuminate.

The figs are borne on old wood, in small clusters on stumpy branchlets.

The pollinating wasp is Courtella bekiliensis bekiliensis (Risbec) in Madagascar, and Courtella bekiliensis bispinosa (Wiebes) on the African mainland.

Gallery

References

External links

polita
Trees of Africa
Afrotropical realm flora
Plants described in 1805
Taxa named by Martin Vahl